This is a partially sorted list of notable persons who have had ties to Columbia University.

This partial list does not include all of the numerous Columbia alumni and faculty who have served as the heads of foreign governments, in the U.S. Presidential Cabinet, the U.S. Executive branch of government, the Federal Courts, or as U.S. Senators, U.S. Congresspersons, Governors, diplomats, mayors (or other notable local officials), or as prominent members of the legal profession or the military.

Presidents 
Dwight D. Eisenhower (President of Columbia University 1948–1953) – 34th President of the United States (1953–1961)
 Barack Obama (B.A. 1983) – 44th President of the United States (2009–2017), U.S. Senator from Illinois (2005–2008)
 Franklin Delano Roosevelt (Law 1904–1907; posthumous J.D., class of 1907) – 32nd President of the United States (1933–1945)
 Theodore Roosevelt (Law 1880–1881; posthumous J.D., class of 1882) – 26th President of the United States (1901–1909) 25th Vice-President of the United States (1901)

Cabinet Secretaries
 Madeleine Albright(Ph.D. 1976, LL.D. (hons.) 1995) Presidential Medal of Freedom (2012); 64th United States Secretary of State under President Bill Clinton (1997–2001), the first female Secretary of State
 Michael Armacost(Ph.D.) Acting United States Secretary of State (1989); U.S. Ambassador to Japan (1989–1993); U.S. Ambassador to the Philippines (1982–1984)
Antony Blinken (J.D. 1988)United States Deputy National Security Advisor (2013–2015); 71st United States Secretary of State (2021–)
 Harold Brown(B.A. 1945, M.A. 1946, Ph.D. 1949), 14th United States Secretary of Defense (1977–81)
 Elaine Chao(graduate study) 24th United States Secretary of Labor (2001–2009); Deputy Secretary of Labor; former Director, Peace Corps
 Bainbridge Colby(J.D. 1891) 43rd United States Secretary of State; founder, 1912 Progressive Party
 Jacob M. Dickinson(Law, attended) 44th United States Secretary of War (1909–1911)
 Hamilton Fish(B.A. 1827), 26th United States Secretary of State (1869–1877)
 Charles Forbesfirst Director (Secretary) of the U.S. Veterans' Bureau (predecessor of the United States Department of Veterans Affairs) (1921–1923)
 James Rudolph Garfield(J.D. 1888) 23rd United States Secretary of the Interior (1907–09), United States Civil Service Commission (1902–1903)
 George Graham(B.A. 1790) United States Secretary of War ad interim (1816–1817) under Presidents James Madison and James Monroe
 John Graham(B.A. 1790) Acting United States Secretary of State (1817)
 Alexander Haig(CBS 1955) 59th United States Secretary of State in Ronald Reagan's administration
 Alexander Hamilton(1774 matriculated, studies interrupted by Revolutionary War) First United States Secretary of Treasury (1789–1795); co-author of The Federalist Papers
 James Alexander Hamilton(B.A.) Acting United States Secretary of State to President Andrew Jackson
 Charles Evans Hughes(J.D. 1884), 44th United States Secretary of State (1921–1925), Associate and Chief Justice of the U.S. Supreme Court
 John Jay(B.A. 1764) Acting United States Secretary of State (1789–90); Sixth President of the Continental Congress (1778–1779); Second United States Secretary of Foreign Affairs (1784–89); Acting United States Secretary of Foreign Affairs (1789); co-author of The Federalist Papers
 Jeh Johnson(J.D.) United States Secretary of Homeland Security (2013–2017)
 Robert R. Livingston(B.A. 1765) First United States Secretary of Foreign Affairs (1781–1783)
 Franklin MacVeagh(J.D. 1864) 45th United States Secretary of the Treasury (1909–13)
 F. David Mathews(Ph.D. 1975) 11th Secretary of United States Department of Health, Education and Welfare under Gerald Ford (1975–1977); President, University of Alabama
 Rogers Morton(VP&S, attended) Special Counselor to President Gerald Ford (with Cabinet rank); 39th United States Secretary of the Interior (1971–1975); 22nd United States Secretary of Commerce (1975–1976); chairman of the Republican National Committee
 Jim Nicholson(M.A.) 5th United States Secretary of Veterans Affairs (2005–2007) under George W. Bush
David Pekoske(M.I.A.) Acting United States Secretary of Homeland Security (2021)
 Frances Perkins(M.A. 1910), 4th United States Secretary of Labor (1933–1945), first female cabinet member; United States Civil Service Commission (1946–1953)
 Frank Polk(LL.B. 1897) Acting United States Secretary of State (1920); Under Secretary of State (1919–1920); headed American Commission to Negotiate Peace (1919)
 Maurice H. Stans(1928–30) 19th United States Secretary of Commerce (1969–72); Director, Office of Management and Budget (Cabinet rank) (1958–1961)
 Walter Stoessel(graduate study) Acting United States Secretary of State; 7th United States Deputy Secretary of State (February 11, 1982 – September 22, 1982)
 Oscar S. Straus(B.A. 1871, J.D.1873) 3rd United States Secretary of Commerce and Labor (1906–09), the first Jewish Presidential Cabinet Secretary
 William H. Woodin(B.A. 1890) 51st United States Secretary of the Treasury under Franklin Roosevelt; directed Administration's declaration and enforcement of a "Bank Holiday" and taking U.S. off international gold standard

Attorneys General

 William Pelham Barr(B.A. 1971, M.A. 1973) 77th and 85th United States Attorney General;  (1991–1993; 2019–2020); 24th United States Deputy Attorney General (1990–1991)
 Eric Holder(B.A. 1973, J.D. 1976) 82nd United States Attorney General (2009–2015); first African-American Attorney General; former Acting U.S. Attorney General in Clinton Administration (2001); 28th U.S. Deputy Attorney General (1997–2001); first AG held in criminal and civil contempt of Congress regarding Operation Fast and Furious investigation (2012)
 Joseph McKenna(before taking seat on U.S. Supreme Court, studied at Columbia Law while AG) 42nd Attorney General of the United States (1897–1898)
 Michael Mukasey(B.A. 1963) 81st United States Attorney General (2007–2009), former U.S. District Judge and Chief Judge
 Harlan Fiske Stone(LL.B. 1898) 52nd United States Attorney General (1924–1925); Associate and Chief Justice of U.S. Supreme Court
 Harold R. Tyler, Jr.(J.D. 1949) 14th United States Deputy Attorney General (2nd ranking official in the U.S. Department of Justice) (1975–1977)
 Lawrence Edward Walsh(A.B. 1932, LL.B. 1935) 4th United States Deputy Attorney General (1957–1960)

Cabinet-level officers

 Madeleine Albright(Certificate in Russian language, M.A., Ph.D.) United States Ambassador to the United Nations (Cabinet rank) (1997–2001); Presidential Medal of Freedom
 Erskine Bowles(M.B.A.) former White House Chief of Staff (Cabinet rank); Administrator of the Small Business Administration  (Cabinet rank); co-chair, President Barack Obama's National Commission on Fiscal Responsibility and Reform with Alan K. Simpson
 Arthur Frank Burns(B.A. 1925, M.A. 1925, Ph.D. 1934) Austrian-born U.S. economist; Chairman, Council of Economic Advisers (Cabinet rank) (1953–56)
 Alan Greenspan (studied for a Ph.D. in economics)former Chairman, Council of Economic Advisers (1974–1977); Presidential Medal of Freedom
 Alexander Haig(M.B.A. 1955) twice White House Chief of Staff (Cabinet rank) under Presidents Richard Nixon and Gerald Ford
Avril Haines 7th Director of National Intelligence, research scholar and deputy director for the Columbia World Projects
 Fred Hochberg(M.B.A.) Administrator of the Small Business Administration (Cabinet rank) (2009–)
 Leon Keyserling(A.B. 1928) Chairman (1950–1953), Acting Chairman (1949), Council of Economic Advisers under President Harry S. Truman; helped draft major New Deal legislation, including National Industrial Recovery Act, Social Security Act, and the National Labor Relations Act
 Jeane Kirkpatrick(Ph.D. 1968, political science) United States Ambassador to the United Nations under Reagan (1981–1985); Presidential Medal of Freedom
 James F. Leonard(1963–64) United States Ambassador to the United Nations (1977–1979)
 Arthur M. Okun(B.A., Ph.D.) Chairman (1968–69), member (1964–69), Council of Economic Advisers
 William K. Reilly(M.S. 1971) 7th Administrator, United States Environmental Protection Agency (EPA) (Cabinet rank) (1989–93)
 Raymond J. Saulnier(Ph.D. 1938) Chairman (1956–1961), member (1955–1956), Council of Economic Advisers
 Daniel D. Tompkins(B.A. 1795) 6th Vice-President of the United States
 Russell E. Train(J.D. 1948) 2nd Administrator, United States Environmental Protection Agency (EPA) (1973–77); Chairman, newly formed President's Council on Environmental Quality (1970–73); Under Secretary, United States Department of the Interior (1967–1970); Presidential Medal of Freedom
 Murray Weidenbaum(M.A.) Chairman, President Ronald Reagan's first Council of Economic Advisers

Directors of Central Intelligence

 George Tenet(M.I.A.) 18th Director of Central Intelligence, Central Intelligence Agency (1997–2004)
 William Colby(LL.B. 1947) 10th Director of Central Intelligence, Central Intelligence Agency (1973–76)
 William J. Donovan(B.A. 1905, J.D. 1908) known as Father of the Central Intelligence Agency; founder and first director of the Office of Strategic Services, the predecessor of the CIA

White House Counsel

 Lanny A. Breuer (B.A. 1980, J.D. 1985)Special White House Counsel (1997–99); Head, Criminal Division, Department of Justice (2009–)
 Harry McPherson (1949–1950)White House Counsel & Special Counsel under President Lyndon Johnson (1963–69)
 Bernard Nussbaum (B.A.)White House Counsel under President Bill Clinton
 David B. Rivkin (J.D.)Legal Advisor to White House Counsel of then President Reagan; Deputy Director, White House Office of Policy Development (OPD)
 Samuel Rosenman (J.D. 1919)first White House Counsel (1943–46)
 Charles F.C. Ruff (J.D. 1963)White House Counsel under Bill Clinton; in Watergate scandal, Special Prosecutor who investigated President Richard Nixon; represented Anita Hill (vs. Clarence Thomas) and Bill Clinton (impeachment)
 Bernard M. Shanley (B.A.)Special Counsel, White House (1953–55); White House Deputy Chief of Staff (1955–57)
 Robert Delahunty (B.A.)Deputy General Counsel, White House Office of Homeland Security (2002–03)
 Joel Klein (B.A.)Deputy White House Counsel under President Bill Clinton
 Donald B. Verrilli Jr. (J.D.)Deputy White House Counsel under President Barack Obama

Members of the Federal Reserve System 

 Arthur F. Burns(B.A. 1925, M.A. 1925, Ph.D. 1934), 10th Chair of the Federal Reserve (1970–1978)
 Richard Clarida(professor of Economics and International Affairs), 21st Vice Chair of the Federal Reserve (2018–2022)
 Alan Greenspan(studied for a Ph.D. in economics), 13th Chair of the Federal Reserve (1987–2006)
 William McChesney Martin(grad. study in economics 1931–37), 9th Chair of the Federal Reserve (1951–1970)
 Randal Quarles(B.A. 1981), 1st Vice Chair of the Federal Reserve for Supervision (2017–2021)

Other presidential advisors 

 Jared Bernstein (Ph.D. 1994) – member of the Council of Economic Advisers (2021)
 Pat Buchanan (M.A. Journalism)White House Communications Director (19851987); coined the phrase "Silent Majority"; speechwriter for President Nixon and Vice President Spiro Agnew; senior advisor, three U.S. presidents, Richard Nixon, Gerald Ford, and Ronald Reagan
Zbigniew Brzezinski 10th National Security Advisor, professor at Columbia University (196072)
James E. Connor (B.A. 1961), White House Cabinet Secretary and Staff secretary to President Gerald Ford
 Jonathan W. Daniels (failed out, CLS)White House Press Secretary under Presidents Franklin D. Roosevelt and Harry S. Truman
Stephen J. Flanagan (B.A. 1973)senior director for Central and Eastern Europe on the National Security Council (1997–99)
 Stephen Friedman (J.D. 1962)Director, United States National Economic Council (2002–05); Chairman, U.S. President's Foreign Intelligence Advisory Board (2005–09)
 Alexander Haig (M.B.A. 1955)Deputy National Security Advisor (1973–75); Vice Chief of Staff of the Army, the second-highest ranking officer in the Army (1973)
 Fred Hochberg (M.B.A.)Chairman, Export-Import Bank of the United States (2009–)
Benjamin Huberman (B.A. 1959) acting Science Advisor to the President in 1981 and acting director of the Office of Science and Technology Policy
 Carl Kaysen (graduate study, 1940–46)Deputy National Security Advisor (1961–63)
 Michael E. Leiter (B.A. 1991)Director of the United States National Counterterrorism Center (2007–2011)
 Harold F. Linder (B.A., Ph.D.)Chairman, Export-Import Bank of the United States (1961–1968), Assistant Secretary of State for Economic and Business Affairs (1952–53)
 Kathleen McGinty (J.D. 1988)Chair of the Council on Environmental Quality (1995–1998); founding Director, White House Office on Environmental Policy
 William Eldridge Odom(M.S. 1962, Ph.D. 1970) former Director of the National Security Agency (NSA) under President Ronald Reagan
 Frank Press (M.A. 1946, Ph.D. 1949)Science Advisor to President Jimmy Carter and Director, White House Office of Science and Technology Policy (1976–1980)
 Isidor Isaac Rabi (Ph.D.)Science Advisor to President Eisenhower and Director, White House Office of Science and Technology Policy (1956–1957)
 Brent Scowcroft (M.A., Ph.D.)9th & 17th United States National Security Advisor (1975–77; 1989–93); Chairman, U.S. President's Foreign Intelligence Advisory Board (2001–05); Deputy National Security Advisor (1970–75)
 George Stephanopoulos (B.A., salutatorian, 1982)initially de facto White House Press Secretary, later Senior Advisor to the President Bill Clinton
 Harold E. Varmus (M.D.)one of three co-chairs, President's Council of Advisors on Science and Technology (2009–)
 Samuel V. Wilson (attended)former Director of the Defense Intelligence Agency; coined the term "counterinsurgency"
 Kenneth J. Arrow (M.A., Ph.D.)Richard Nixon's Council of Economic Advisers
 Daniel Fried (M.I.A. 1977)Special Envoy to Guantanamo (2009–); Special Assistant to the President and member, United States National Security Council (2001–2005)
 Toby Gati (M.A. 1970, M.I.A. 1972)Special Assistant to the President and member, United States National Security Council (1993)
 M.R.C. Greenwood (postdoctoral study)Associate Director for Science, White House Office of Science and Technology Policy during the Clinton Administration
 Matt Latimer (M.S.)Special Assistant to the President for Speechwriting during the administration of President George W. Bush
 Kenneth Lieberthal (M.A., Ph.D. 1972)Special Assistant to the President and Senior Director, U.S. National Security Council during the Clinton Administration
 Michel Oksenberg (M.A. 1963, Ph.D. 1969)member, United States National Security Council; closely involved in normalization of U.S.-China relations undertaken during the administration of President Jimmy Carter
 Paul Seabury (Ph.D.)U.S. President's Foreign Intelligence Advisory Board; 1964 Bancroft Prize
 Gary Sick (Ph.D. 1973)U.S. National Security Council under Presidents Ford, Carter, and Reagan; principal White House aide for Persian Gulf affairs (1976–1981) (including Iranian revolution and the hostage crisis)
 Robert Suettinger(M.A.) President Bill Clinton's national intelligence officer for East Asia at the National Intelligence Council (1997–1998)
 Paul Weinstein (M.A.)Special Assistant to the President and Chief of Staff, White House Domestic Policy Council during the Clinton Administration
 Marina von Neumann Whitman (M.A. 1959, Ph.D. 1962)member, Richard Nixon's Council of Economic Advisers (1973–74)
 Mark Barnes (LL.M. 1991)member, National Health Care Reform Task Force under President Bill Clinton
 Jared Bernstein (M.A., Ph.D. 1994)member, Presidential Task Force on the Auto Industry; Executive Director, White House Middle Class Working Families Task Force; Chief Economist and Economic Policy Advisor to Vice President Joseph Biden in the administration of President Barack Obama (2009–11)
 Ursula Burns (M.S. 1981)Vice-Chairman, Obama Administration's Export Council (2010–)
 Mark Gallogly (M.B.A. 1986)Barack Obama's President's Economic Recovery Advisory Board
 Ulysses S. Grant Jr. (LL.B. 1876)personal secretary, President Ulysses S. Grant
 Ken Khachigian (J.D. 1969)speechwriter for President Richard Nixon, Chief speechwriter for President Ronald Reagan
 Charles Edward Merriam (M.A. 1897, Ph.D., political science, 1900)advisor to several presidents, including Franklin D. Roosevelt
 Raymond Moley (Ph.D. 1918)Presidential Medal of Freedom (1970); senior adviser, Franklin D. Roosevelt; a leading New Dealer; leading member of first Brain Trust; recruited its members from Columbia faculty; later became sharp critic of New Deal
 Dick Morris (B.A. 1967)Chief political advisor to President Bill Clinton in his first term; first use of term triangulation
 Lynn Forester de Rothschild (J.D. 1980)United States Secretary of Energy Advisory Board under President Bill Clinton
 Ben Stein (B.A. 1966)speechwriter and lawyer for President Richard Nixon and later for President Gerald Ford
Steven Simon (B.A. 1974)senionr director for the Middle East and North Africa on the National Security Council (1997–99)
 Rexford Tugwell (Ph.D.)part of Franklin D. Roosevelt's first "Brain Trust", and was one of the chief intellectual contributors to his New Deal
 Michael Waldman (B.A. 1982)Director of Speechwriting for President Clinton (1995–99), member of the Presidential Commission on the Supreme Court of the United States
 Harry Dexter White (attended 1922)senior Treasury official for Franklin D. Roosevelt, helped found World Bank and International Monetary Fund (IMF); alleged in Venona list to be Soviet spy
Tim WuSpecial Assistant to the President for Technology and Competition Policy, Professor at Columbia University (2006)

Commissioners and agency heads, sub-cabinet members
Sharon Block (B.A. 1987)Acting Administrator of the Office of Information and Regulatory Affairs (2021–), member of the National Labor Relations Board (2012–13) 
Amit Bose (B.A. 1994)Acting Administrator of the Federal Railroad Administration 
Harold Brown(B.A. 1945, M.A. 1946, Ph.D. 1949), 8th United States Secretary of the Air Force (1965–69) 
L. Francis Cissna (M.I.A. 1990)director of the United States Citizenship and Immigration Services (2017–19)
Julie Chung (M.I.A. 1996)Acting Assistant Secretary of State for Western Hemisphere Affairs (2021–), United States Ambassador to Sri Lanka and the Maldives nominee
Alan D. Cohn (B.A. 1993)Assistant Secretary for Strategy, Plans, Analysis and Risk, U.S. Department of Homeland Security
John Collier (B.A. 1906)United States Commissioner of Indian Affairs (1933–1945), implemented reform of federal Indian policy
 Monica Crowley (Ph.D.)Assistant Secretary for Public Affairs of the U.S. Department of the Treasury (2019–21)
William O. Douglas (LL.B. 1925)third Chairman, United States Securities and Exchange Commission (1936–39)
 Nathan Feinsinger (Law, post-graduate study)former Chairman, United States Wage Stabilization Board
 Joseph F. Finnegan (B.A. 1928)fourth Director, Federal Mediation and Conciliation Service (1955–1961)
Thibaut de Saint Phalle (B.A. 1939)director of the Export–Import Bank of the United States (1977–1981)
 William Dudley Foulke (B.A. 1869, LL.B. 1871)Commissioner, United States Civil Service Commission
 Tom Frieden (M.D., M.P.H.)Director, Centers for Disease Control and Prevention (CDC) (2009–2017);  Administrator, Agency for Toxic Substances and Disease Registry (2009–2017)
Charles Frankel (B.A. 1937)Assistant Secretary of State for Educational and Cultural Affairs (1965–67)
 Robert A. Frosch (B.A., M.A., Ph.D.)Fifth Administrator, National Aeronautics and Space Administration (NASA) (1977–81), Assistant Secretary of the Navy (Research and Development) 
 Harvey Goldschmid (B.A. 1965)Commissioner (2002–05), and previously General Counsel, special adviser to Chairman, United States Securities and Exchange Commission
 Julius Genachowski (B.A. 1985)Chairman, United States Federal Communications Commission (FCC) (2009–13)
 Henry Clay Hall (LL.B. 1883)twice Chairman (1917–1918, 1924), Commissioner (1914–1928), Interstate Commerce Commission
Robert O. Harris (B.A. 1951) twice Chairman of the National Mediation Board (1979–80, 1982–83)
John D. Hawke, Jr. (J.D. 1960)United States Comptroller of the Currency (1998–2004); Under Secretary of the Treasury for Domestic Finance (1995–1998)
 Joseph Hendrie (Ph.D. 1957)former Chairman, U.S. Nuclear Regulatory Commission
 Edward Hidalgo (J.D. 1936)Secretary of the Air Force (1979–1981); Assistant Secretary of the Navy (Manpower and Reserve Affairs) (1977–1979)
John H. Hilldring (attended 1914-1916)Assistant Secretary of State for Occupied Areas (1946–47)
Colin Kahl (Ph.D. 2000)Under Secretary of Defense for Policy (2021–), National Security Advisor to the Vice President (2014–17)
 Robert Karem (B.A. 2000)Acting Under Secretary of Defense for Policy (2017) Assistant Secretary of Defense for International Security Affairs (2017–2018)
 Lina Khan – Chairwoman (2021–), Federal Trade Commission; professor at Columbia Law School
 William Kovacic (J.D. 1978) Chairman (2008–2009), Commissioner (2006–2009), Federal Trade Commission
 Craig E. Leen (J.D. 2000)Director, Office of Federal Contract Compliance Programs, U.S. Department of Labor (2018–21)
 Michael E. Leiter (B.A. 1991)Director, United States National Counterterrorism Center (NCTC), during capture of Osama bin Laden (2007–)
 Irving Lewis "Scooter" Libby (J.D. 1975)Chief of Staff, Vice President Dick Cheney (2001–05); convicted on obstruction of justice charges for his role in Plame affair (2007)
Nancy McEldowney (M.I.A. 1986)National Security Advisor to the Vice President (2021–)
Allan I. Mendelowitz (B.A. 1966)Chairman of the Federal Housing Finance Board (2000–01)
 Charles E. F. Millard (J.D. 1985)Director, United States Pension Benefit Guaranty Corporation (2007–09)
John Bassett MooreUnited States Assistant Secretary of State (1898), Columbia professor (1891–1924)
Richard M. Moose (M.A. 1954)Assistant Secretary of State for African Affairs (1977–81), Under Secretary of State for Management (1992–96)
Geoff Morrell (M.S. 1992)Press Secretary for the US Department of Defense (2007–11)
Michael Mundaca (B.A. 1986)Assistant Secretary for Tax Policy in the U.S. Department of the Treasury (2010–11)
Brian Murphy (M.A. 2006)Acting Under Secretary of Homeland Security for Intelligence and Analysis (2018–20)
Annette Nazareth (J.D. 1981)Commissioner, United States Securities and Exchange Commission (2005–08)
 Myrna Pérez (J.D. 2003)nominee, Commissioner, Election Assistance Commission (2011–)
 Robert Pitofsky (LL.B. 1954)Chairman (1995–2001), Commissioner (1978–81), Federal Trade Commission
 Donald A. Quarles (graduate studies)Secretary of the Air Force; Deputy Secretary of Defense (2nd ranking official in the Department of Defense)
 Thomasina V. Rogers (J.D. 1976)Chairman (2009–; 1999–02), Commissioner (2009–; 03–09; 1998–03) U.S. Occupational Safety and Health Review Commission; first woman designated Chairman; only African American to serve on the Commission.
David Rothkopf (B.A. 1977) Acting Under Secretary of Commerce for International Trade (1995–96)
Louis M. Rousselot (B.A. 1923)Assistant Secretary of Defense for Health Affairs (1970–71)
 William E. Simkin (graduate studies)fifth Director, Federal Mediation and Conciliation Service, longest-serving Director (1961–1969)
 Mozelle Thompson (B.A. 1976, J.D. 1981)Commissioner, Federal Trade Commission (1997–2004)
 Harold Varmus (M.D.)Director, National Cancer Institute (2010–)Director, National Institutes of Health (1993–99); Nobel Laureate
 Mary Jo White (J.D. 1974), Chairman (2013–), Commissioner (2013–) United States Securities and Exchange Commission
 Karan K. Bhatia (J.D. 1993)Deputy United States Trade Representative (2nd ranking official in the U.S. Office of Trade Representative) (2005–)
 Frank Blake (J.D. 1976)Deputy United States Secretary of Energy (2nd ranking official in the U.S. Department of Energy)
 Reuben Clark (LL.B. 1906)Under Secretary of State (from 1919 to 1972, 2nd ranking official in the U.S. Department of State)
 Carol A. DiBattiste (LL.M. 1986)former United States Under Secretary of the Air Force (2nd highest civilian official in the U.S. Department of the Air Force) (1999–2001)
 Eric Hargan (J.D.)Acting Deputy Secretary, United States Department of Health and Human Services under President George W. Bush
 John C. Inglis (M.S. Mech. Eng. 1977)former Deputy Director, National Security Agency (2006–2014)
 Robert Joseph (Ph.D. 1978)Under Secretary of State for Arms Control and International Security (2005–2007)
 Madeleine Kunin (M.A.)United States Deputy Secretary of Education (2nd ranking official in the U.S. Department of Education) (1993–1997)
 James T. O'Connell (B.A. 1928)United States Deputy Secretary of Labor (1957–1962)
Randal Quarles (B.A. 1981)Under Secretary of the Treasury for Domestic Finance (2005–2006), Vice Chair of the Federal Reserve (2017–)
Karthik Ramanathan (B.A. 1994)Assistant Secretary of the Treasury for Financial Markets (2008–2010)
Steven Reich (B.A. 1983)Associate Deputy Attorney General (2011–2013)
Philippe Reines (B.A. 2000) Deputy Assistant Secretary for Strategic Communications in the United States Department of State
James J. Reynolds (B.A. 1928) United States Deputy Secretary of Labor (1967–1969)
 George Lockhart Rives (B.A. 1868, LL.B.1873)United States Assistant Secretary of State (1853–1913, 2nd ranking official in the U.S. Department of State) (1887–89)
 Franklin Delano Roosevelt (Law 1904–1907; posthumous J.D., class of 1907)U.S. Assistant Secretary of the Navy (from 1861 to 1954, second highest civilian office in Department of the Navyreporting to U.S. Secretary of the Navy who until 1947 was a member of the President's Cabinet)
 Theodore Roosevelt (Law 1880–1881; posthumous J.D., class of 1882)U.S. Assistant Secretary of the Navy
 James P. Rubin (B.A. 1982, M.A. 1984)Chief Spokesperson for the State Department, considered Secretary Albright's right-hand man in Clinton Administration; United States Assistant Secretary of State for Public Affairs (1997–2000)
William Cary Sanger (LL.B. 1878)United States Assistant Secretary of War (1901–03)
Andrew J. Shapiro (J.D. 1994)Assistant Secretary of State for Political-Military Affairs (2009–2013)
William H. Shaw (B.A. 1930)Assistant Secretary of Commerce for Economic Affairs (1966–68)
Justin Shubow (B.A. 1999)Chairman (2021) and member (2018–21) of the United States Commission of Fine Arts 
Eve Slater (M.D. 1971)United States Assistant Secretary for Health and Human Services (2002–2003)
 Joan E. Spero (M.A. 1968, Ph.D. 1973)Under Secretary of State for Economic Growth, Energy, and the Environment (1993–97)
 John J. Sullivan (J.D. 1985)United States Deputy Secretary of Commerce (2008–2009), United States Deputy Secretary of State (2017–19)
 Gardiner L. Tucker (B.A. 1947)Assistant Secretary for Systems Analysis (1970–73), Assistant Secretary General of NATO for Defense Support (1973–76)
J. Mayhew Wainwright (B.A. 1884, J.D. 1886)U.S. Assistant Secretary of War (2nd ranking official in the U.S. Department of War until 1940) (1921–23)
Ronald Weich (B.A. 1980)United States Assistant Attorney General for the Office of Legislative Affairs
Felix Wormser (B.S. 1916)Assistant Secretary of the Interior for Mineral Resources (1954–57)
 Arturo Valenzuela (Ph.D. 1971)Assistant Secretary of State for Western Hemisphere Affairs (2009–11)
Tracy Voorhees (J.D. 1915)Under Secretary of the United States Army (2nd ranking official in the U.S. Army) (1949–50)
Dov Zakheim(B.A. 1970)Under Secretary of Defense (Comptroller) (2001–04), signatory to manifesto Rebuilding America's Defenses (2000) of the Project for the New American Century

Solicitors general
 Lloyd Wheaton Bowers (J.D.)United States Solicitor General (1909–1910)
 Charles Fried (J.D.)United States Solicitor General (1985–1989); Acting Solicitor General; Deputy Solicitor General
 Daniel M. Friedman (A.B., J.D.)Acting United States Solicitor General (1977); First Deputy Solicitor General
 Stanley Foreman Reed (J.D.)United States Solicitor General (1935–1938)
 Donald Verrilli Jr. (J.D.)United States Solicitor General (2011–2016); United States Deputy Attorney General; Deputy Counsel to the President
 R. Kent Greenawalt (J.D.)Deputy United States Solicitor General (1971–1972)

Judges

Supreme Court Justices 

 Samuel Blatchford(B.A. 1837), associate justice
 Benjamin Cardozo(B.A. 1889, M.A. 1890), associate justice
 William O. Douglas(LL.B. 1925), associate justice
 Ruth Bader Ginsburg(LL.B. 1959), associate justice
 Neil Gorsuch(B.A. 1988), associate justice
 Charles Evans Hughes(LL.B. 1884), associate and chief justice
 John Jay(B.A. 1764, M.A. 1767), chief justice
 Joseph McKenna(attended law school), associate justice
 Stanley Forman Reed(attended law school), associate justice
 Harlan Fiske Stone(LL.B. 1898), associate and chief justice

U.S. federal judges

U.S. non-federal judges 

 Sheila Abdus-Salaam – (J.D. 1977), associate judge, New York Court of Appeals
 Rolando Acosta(B.A., J.D.), presiding justice of the First Judicial Department
 Willard Bartlett(B.A.), Chief Judge, New York Court of Appeals (1914–1916)
 Edgar M. Cullen(B.A. 1860), Chief Judge, New York Court of Appeals (1904–1913)
 John J. "Jack" Farley, III(M.B.A. 1966), former judge, United States Court of Appeals for Veterans Claims
 Jaime Fuster(LL.M. 1966), associate justice, Supreme Court of Puerto Rico
 Eric Holder(B.A. 1973, J.D. 1976), judge, Superior Court of the District of Columbia, U.S. Attorney for the District of Columbia, Deputy U.S. Attorney General
 Samuel Jones(1790), Fifth Chancellor of New York; ex officio member, New York Court of Appeals
 Robert R. LivingstonFirst Chancellor of New York, administered oath of office to President George Washington, negotiated the Louisiana Purchase
 Deborah Poritz(graduate study), Chief Justice, New Jersey Supreme Court (1996–06); Attorney General of New Jersey (1994–96); first woman to serve in each position
 Eric T. Washington(J.D. 1979), Chief Judge, District of Columbia Court of Appeals, the highest appellate court for the District of Columbia
 Augustus B. Woodward(B.A. 1793), first Chief Justice, Michigan Territory; appointed by President Thomas Jefferson; with the governor and two associate justices possessed all the legislative power in the Territory from 1805 until 1824; co-founded the University of Michigan

Foreign judges 
 Joaquim Barbosa(visiting scholar, CLS, 1999, 2000), Chief Justice of Brazil (2012–); only black Supreme Federal Court justice minister in Brazil
 Karin Maria Bruzelius(LL.M. 1969), justice of the Supreme Court of Norway (1997–2011)
 Lawrence Collins, Baron Collins of Mapesbury(LL.M.), former Justice of the Supreme Court of the United Kingdom (2009–2011); Lord of Appeal in Ordinary (2009); Lord Justice of Appeal (2007–09); Judicial Committee of the Privy Council (see the Privy Council) (February 2007–); judge, High Court of England and Wales (2000)
 Susan Denham(LL.M.), 11th Chief Justice (2011–), Associate Justice (1992–2011), Supreme Court of Ireland, first female Chief Justice
 Philip Jessup(Ph.D.), Judge, International Court of Justice (1961–1970)
 V.K. Wellington Koo(B.A., Ph.D.), Judge, International Court of Justice (1957–1967), former President of the Republic of China, Premier of the Republic of China and Chinese ambassador to the United States
 Marvic Mario Victor F. Leonen(LL.M.), Associate Justice, Supreme Court of the Philippines(2012–)
 Liana Fiol Matta(LL.M., S.J.D.), second woman in Puerto Rican history to serve as Associate Justice, Supreme Court of Puerto Rico (as of 2011)
 John T. McDonough(LL.B. 1861), appointed by President Theodore Roosevelt as Associate Justice, Supreme Court of the Philippines
 George Moe(LL.M.), Chief Justice, Supreme Court of Belize (1982–85); Justice, Eastern Caribbean Supreme Court (1985–1991)
 Sean Murphy (J.D. 1985), member, U.N. International Law Commission (2011–)
 Shi Jiuyong(LL.M. 1951), former President, U.N. International Court of Justice (2003–2010); former Chairman, International Law Commission
 Francis M. Ssekandi(LL.M.), former Justice, Supreme Court of Uganda (the highest court in the country of Uganda); Judge, World Bank Administrative Tribunal (2007–)
 Hironobu Takesaki(LL.M. 1971), 17th Chief Justice of the Supreme Court of Japan (the highest court in the country of Japan) (2008–)
 Umu Hawa Tejan-Jalloh(LL.M.), Chief Justice (2008–), Associate Justice (2002–2008), Supreme Court of Sierra Leone
 Smokin Wanjala(LL.M.), Associate Justice of the Supreme Court of Kenya (2012–)
 Xue Hanqin(LL.M. 1983, J.S.D. 1995), Judge, U.N. International Court of Justice (2010–); Chinese diplomat and international law expert
 Richard Whitehead Young(LL.B. 1884), appointed by President William McKinley as Associate Justice, Supreme Court of the Philippines; also a U.S. Army Brigadier General

U.S. Senators

U.S. Representatives

Governors

U.S. Diplomats

 G. Norman Anderson (B.A.) United States Ambassador to Sudan (1986-1989)
Michael Armacost(Ph.D.) United States Ambassador to Japan (1989–1993); U.S. Ambassador to the Philippines (1982–1984)
 Robert L. Barry(M.A. 1962) United States Ambassador to Indonesia (1992–1995); also United States Ambassador to Bulgaria
 Vincent Martin Battle(M.A. 1967, Ph.D. 1974) United States Ambassador to Lebanon (2001–2004)
 Richard E. Benedick(B.A.) former diplomat; chief United States negotiator, Montreal Protocol
 Avis Bohlen(M.A. 1965) diplomat, United States Ambassador to Bulgaria (1996–99)
 Arthur Frank Burns(B.A., M.A., Ph.D.) United States Ambassador to West Germany (1981–1985)
Raymond Burghardt(B.A.) director (1999-2001), and chairman (2006-2016) of the American Institute in Taiwan and U.S. Ambassador to Vietnam (2002-2004)
 Patricia A. Butenis(M.A.) United States Ambassador to Sri Lanka (2009–); United States Ambassador to the Maldives (2009–); United States Ambassador to Bangladesh
 Reuben Clark(J.D.) United States Ambassador to Mexico (1930–1933)
 William Clark, Jr.(M.A.) United States Ambassador to India (1989–1992)
Richard T. Davies (B.A.) United States Ambassador to Poland (1973-1978)
Jonathan Dean (B.A.) United States Representative for Mutual and Balanced Force Reductions negotiations from 1979 to 1981
 Christopher Dell(B.A. 1978) United States Ambassador, Republic of Kosovo (2009–); U.S. Ambassador to Angola (2001–04); U.S. Ambassador to Zimbabwe (2004–07)
 William Joseph Donovan(B.A. 1905, J.D.) United States Ambassador to Thailand (1953–1954)
 Millicent Fenwick(B.A.) United States Ambassador to the United Nations Agencies for Food and Agriculture (1983–1987)
 Daniel Fried(M.A.) U.S. Special Envoy, Guantanamo, rank of Ambassador (2009–); top U.S. diplomat in Europe (2005–09); United States Ambassador to Poland (1997–00)
 David M. Friedman(B.A.) United States Ambassador to Israel (2017-2021)
Daniel Lewis Foote (B.A.) United States Ambassador to Zambia (2017-2020)
 James W. Gerard(B.A. 1890) United States Ambassador to Germany (1913–1917)
 Henry F. Grady(Ph.D. 1984) first U.S. Ambassador to India (1947–1948); concurrently U.S.Ambassador to Nepal (1948); U.S. Ambassador to Greece (1948–1950); U.S. Ambassador to Iran (1950–1951)
 Gordon Gray III(M.A. 1982) United States Ambassador to Tunisia (September 2009 – 2012)
 Howard Gutman(B.A. 1977) United States Ambassador to Belgium (2009–2013)
 Suzanne K. Hale(B.A.) former United States Ambassador to Federated States of Micronesia (2004–2007)
 Martin J. Hillenbrand(M.A. 1938, Ph.D. 1948) U.S. Ambassador to the Federal Republic of Germany (1972–1976); United States Ambassador to Hungary (1967–1969)
John L. Hirsch(B.A.) United States Ambassador to Sierra Leone (1995-1998)
Eric M. Javits(B.A.) Ambassador and Permanent U.S. Representative to the Conference on Disarmament in Geneva (2001-2003); United States Permanent Representative to the Organisation for the Prohibition of Chemical Weapons (2003-2009)
 Robert G. Joseph(Ph.D. 1978) former United States Special Envoy for Nuclear Nonproliferation (rank of Ambassador); also Under Secretary of State for Arms Control
 Ismail Khalidi(Ph.D. 1955) the senior political affairs officer in the department of political and security council affairs for the United Nations
 Madeleine M. Kunin(CSJ) United States Ambassador to Switzerland (1996–1999), United States Ambassador to Liechtenstein (1996–1999)
Denis Lamb(B.S.) United States Ambassador to the Organisation for Economic Co-operation and Development (1987-1990)
Luis J. Lauredo(B.A.) United States Ambassador to the Organization of American States (2001-2003)
 James R. LilleyU.S. Ambassador to China at time of Tiananmen Square (1989–91); U.S. Ambassador to Korea (1986–89); Director, American Institute in Taiwan (1981–84)
 Harold F. Linder(B.A.) United States Ambassador to Canada (1968–1969); President, Export-Import Bank of the United States (1961–1968)
 William H. Luers(M.A.) United States Ambassador to Venezuela (1978–82) and United States Ambassador to Czechoslovakia (1983–86)
 David E. Mark(B.A., LL.M.) U.S. Ambassador to Burundi (1974–77); career Minister, U.S. Foreign Service, Germany, Moscow; helped Georgians write their Constitution
 Jack Matlock(M.A. 1952) United States Ambassador to the Soviet Union (1987–1991); United States Ambassador to Czechoslovakia (1981–1983)
 Brett H. McGurk (J.D. 1999), nominee, U.S. Ambassador to the Republic of Iraq (2012); Special Presidential Envoy for the Global Coalition to Counter the Islamic State of Iraq and the Levant (2015-2018)
Mark C. Minton(B.A.) U.S. Ambassador to Mongolia (2006-2009)
Hector Morales(B.A.) United States Ambassador to the Organization of American States (2008-2009)
 Jim Nicholson(M.A.) United States Ambassador to the Holy See (2001–2005)
 B. Lynn Pascoe(M.A.) United States Ambassador to Indonesia (2004–07) and Malaysia (1999–01); Under-Secretary-General of the United Nations for Political Affairs (2007–)
 Robert E. Patterson(M.A., M.Phil) United States Ambassador to Turkmenistan under President Barack Obama (2011–)
 Mark Pekala(M.I.A. 1983, M.Phil. 1988) U.S. Ambassador to Latvia under President Barack Obama (2012–)
 John Dyneley Prince(M.A. 1898) U.S. Ambassador to Denmark (1921–1926); U.S. Ambassador to Yugoslavia (1926–1937)
 Michael A. Raynor(M.A.) former United States Ambassador to Benin (2012–2015) and nominee to become United States Ambassador to Ethiopia
 Mitchell Reiss(J.D.) United States Special Envoy for Northern Ireland (rank of Ambassador) (stepped down in 2007); former Chief negotiator for the United States in the Korean Peninsula Energy Development Organization
 Julissa Reynoso (J.D. 2001), United States Ambassador to Uruguay (2012–)
 William E. Schaufele, Jr.(M.A. 1950) U.S. Ambassador to Upper Volta (1969–71); U.S. representative, United Nations Security Council (rank of ambassador) (1971–75); U.S. Ambassador to Poland (1978–80)
 Eugene Schuyler(LL.M. 1863), first American diplomat to visit Central Asia, first U.S. Minister to Romania and Serbia, also U.S. Minister to Greece
 Elliott P. Skinner(M.A. 1952, Ph.D. 1955) anthropologist; United States Ambassador to Republic of Upper Volta (1966–1969)
 Sichan Siv(M.A.) diplomat and former U.S. representative to the United Nations Economic and Social Council (rank of Ambassador) (2001–06)
Monteagle Stearns (B.A.) United States Ambassador to Ivory Coast (1976-1979); United States Ambassador to Greece (1981-1985)
 Laurence A. Steinhardt(B.A., M.A., LL.B. 1915) U.S. Ambassador to the Soviet Union (1939–1941); U.S. Ambassador to Turkey (1942–1945); U.S. Ambassador to Czechoslovakia (1945–1948); U.S. Ambassador to Sweden (1933–1937); U.S. Ambassador to Peru (1937–1939); U.S. Ambassador to Canada (1948–1950)
 Walter Stoessel(graduate study) U.S. Ambassador to Poland (1968–72); U.S. Ambassador to the Soviet Union (1974–76); U.S. Ambassador to West Germany (1976–80)
 Oscar S. Straus(B.A. 1871, LL.B. 1873) thrice United States Ambassador to the Ottoman Empire (1887–1889, 1898–1899, 1910–1912)
 James Daniel Theberge(B.A. 1952) United States Ambassador to Nicaragua (1975–1977); United States Ambassador to Chile (1982–1985)
 Harry K. Thomas, Jr.(graduate study) Director General, United States Foreign Service (2007–2009); United States Ambassador to the Philippines (2010–); United States Ambassador to Bangladesh  (2003–2005)
 Alexander Vershbow(M.A. 1976) United States Ambassador to South Korea (2005–2008); United States Ambassador to the Russian Federation (2001–2005); United States Ambassador to NATO (1998–2001)
 Ross Wilson (ambassador)(M.A. 1979) United States Ambassador to Turkey (2005–2008); U.S. Ambassador to the Republic of Azerbaijan (2000–2003)
 Donald Yamamoto(B.A., graduate study) U.S. Ambassador to Ethiopia (2006–09); U.S. Ambassador to Djibouti (2000–03); U.S. Ambassadorto Eritrea ad interim (1997–98)
J. Owen Zurhellen Jr.(B.A.) first United States Ambassador to Suriname (1976-1978)

Non-U.S. Attorneys General
 Salahuddin Ahmad(LL.M. 1970) Attorney General of Bangladesh (2008–2009)
 Obed Asamoah(M.A.), longest serving foreign minister and Attorney General of Ghana under President Jerry Rawlings (1981–1997)
 Jerome Choquette(CBS) Attorney General of Canada, also Canadian Minister of Justice (1970–1975), Minister of Education (1975), Minister of Financial Institutions (1970)
 Włodzimierz Cimoszewicz(Fulbright scholar, research, 1980 through 1981) Public Prosecutor General and Minister of Justice of the Republic of Poland (1993–95)
 Mark MacGuigan(LL.M., J.S.D.) Attorney General of Canada, also Canadian Minister of Justice (1982–1984); Canadian Secretary of State for External Affairs (1980–1982)
 Githu Muigai(LL.M. 1986) current Attorney General of Kenya (August 2011–)
 Mikhail Saakashvili(LL.M. 1994) former Minister of Justice of Georgia
 Abdul Satar Sirat(B.A.) former Minister of Justice of Afghanistan

Non-U.S. Ministers, diplomats and prominent political figures

Military

Attorneys

City government

Mayors of New York City 

 DeWitt Clinton(B.A. 1786), 47th, 49th and 51st Mayor of New York City (1803–07, 1808–10, 1811–15)
 Edward Cooper(H.T. 1842), 83rd Mayor of New York City (1879–90)
 Bill de Blasio(M.I.A. 1987), 109th Mayor of New York City (2014–21)
 John Ferguson(B.A. 1795), 52nd Mayor of New York City (1815)
 Hugh J. Grant(LL.B. 1878), 88th Mayor of New York City (1889–92)
 William Frederick Havemeyer(B.A. 1823), 66th, 69th and 80th Mayor of New York City (1873–74, 1848–49, 1845–46)
 Abram Hewitt(B.A. 1842), 87th Mayor of New York City (1887–88)
 Seth Low(B.A. 1870), 92nd Mayor of New York City (1902–03); 23rd Mayor of Brooklyn (1881–85)
 John Purroy Mitchel(B.A. 1899), 95th Mayor of New York City (1914–17)
 Henry C. Murphy(B.A. 1830), 5th Mayor of Brooklyn (1842)
 Robert Anderson Van Wyck(B.A. 1872), 91st Mayor of New York City (1898–1901); first mayor post-consolidation

Other mayors

Commentators
 Amotz Asa-El(M.A. History and Journalism) leading commentator on Israeli, Middle Eastern, and Jewish affairs
 Dan Abrams(J.D. 1992) media legal commentator
 Paul Stuart Appelbaum(B.A.) psychiatrist, commentator and expert on legal and ethical issues in medicine and psychiatry
 Jedediah Bila(M.A.) conservative political commentator, columnist, culture critic, and author
 Joyce Brothers(Ph.D.) known as Dr. Joyce Brothers, advice columnist, commentator, and first media psychologist
 Pat Buchanan(CSJ 1962) conservative columnist, broadcast commentator, author
 Dalton Camp(CSJ) Canadian journalist, political commentator and strategist, central figure in Red Toryism
 Leonard A. Cole(M.A., Ph.D.) commentator and expert on bioterrorism and terror medicine
 Lennard J. Davis(B.A., M.A., M.Phil., Ph.D.) commentator on the intersection of culture, medicine, disability, and biotechnology
 Jim Dunnigan(B.A.) considered "The Dean of Modern Wargaming", founder of Simulations Publications, Inc. and the most prolific board wargame designer in history, as well as a being a renowned military analyst
 Lawrence Fertig(M.A.) libertarian journalist, economic commentator
 Mario Gabelli(CBS) financial commentator
 Ralph GleasonAmerican jazz and popular music critic and commentator
 Keli Goffpolitical commentator and blogger
 Ellis Henican(M.A.) commentator, columnist for Newsday and Fox News Channel
 Jim Hightowerliberal political commentator, writer for The Progressive Populist
 Molly Ivins(CSJ) self-described "left-libertarian" political commentator, newspaper columnist, humorist, bestselling author
 Hilton KramerU.S. art critic and cultural commentator
 Steve Liesman(CSJ) senior economic commentator on NBC
 Edward Luck(M.I.A., M.A., M.Ph., Ph.D.) media commentator on arms control, defense, foreign policy and affairs, as well as United Nations reform and peacekeeping
 Kenneth McFarland(M.A.) conservative commentator, public speaker, author, superintendent of Topeka, Kansas school system during Brown v. Board of Education
 John McLaughlin(Ph.D.) political commentator, host of The McLaughlin Group on PBS
 Shireen Mazari(Ph.D.) commentator on global strategic issues affecting peace and security; Pakistani political scientist
 Julie Menin(B.A.) television news commentator on politics and the law
 Dick Morris(B.A. 1967) political commentator and author
 Norman Podhoretz(B.A.) Presidential Medal of Freedom; editor of Commentary, a founder of Neoconservatism connected with the Project for the New American Century
 Alvin F. Poussaint(B.S. 1956) commentator on race and American society; well known psychiatrist; author
 James Rubin(B.A. 1982, M.I.A. 1984) Sky News commentator and television journalist
 Ralph Schoenstein(B.A.) former commentator on NPR's All Things Considered
 Laura Schlessinger(Ph.D. 1974) nationally syndicated radio show, The Dr. Laura Program; conservative commentator
 Thomas Sowell(M.A.) economist, conservative social commentator, author
 Ben Stein(B.A. 1966) conservative economic and political commentator, writer, actor, attorney
 George Stephanopoulos(B.A. 1982) senior adviser to Bill Clinton, television anchor, media journalist, and political commentator
 Ilan Stavans(Ph.D.) commentator on American, Hispanic, and Jewish cultures
 Samuel A. Tannenbaum(CSJ) early commentator on Shakespeare and his contemporaries
 Cenk Uygur(J.D.) political commentator, internet and television personality, and political activist

Candidates
 Nicholas Murray Butler(B.A., M.A., Ph.D.) vice-presidential candidate with President William Howard Taft in 1912 election (against former President Theodore Roosevelt and Woodrow Wilson)
 D. Leigh Colvin(Law) Prohibition Party vice-presidential candidate (1920) (lost)
 Thomas Dewey(Law 1925) presidential candidate in 1944 election (against Franklin D. Roosevelt) and in 1948 (against President Harry S. Truman) in "Dewey Beats Truman" election
 Miguel Estrada(B.A. 1983) nominee to the United States Court of Appeals for the District of Columbia Circuit
 Matt Gonzalez(B.A. 1987) Ralph Nader 2008 vice-presidential running mate, former president San Francisco Board of Supervisors
 Judd Gregg(B.A. 1969) Republican Senator from New Hampshire (1993–); nominee for United States Secretary of Commerce in the Democratic administration of President Barack Obama; the senator withdrew his name from nomination on February 12, 2009 (because of widening ideological differences with the administration)
 William B. Hornblower(B.A. 1875) unsuccessfully nominated to the United States Supreme Court by President Grover Cleveland in 1893
 Charles Evans Hughes(Law 1884) presidential candidate in 1916 election (against President Woodrow Wilson)
 Franklin Roosevelt(Law) vice-presidential candidate with James M. Cox in 1920 election (against Warren Harding)
 Theodore Roosevelt(Law) presidential candidate in 1912 election (against President William Howard Taft and Woodrow Wilson); formed Progressive Party, known as the Bull Moose Party
 Wayne Allan Root(B.A. 1983same class as President Barack Obama) journalist, 2008 vice-presidential candidate for Libertarian Party

Spies (or alleged)

 Elizabeth BentleyAmerican spy for Soviet Union from 1938 until 1945; in 1945 she defected from Soviet intelligence and became a key informer for the U.S.
 Whittaker Chambersadmitted Soviet spy in the Ware Group; testified against Alger Hiss
 Morris Cohenconvicted Soviet spy, subject of Hugh Whitemore's drama for stage and TV "Pack of Lies"; instrumental in relaying atomic bomb secrets to the Kremlin in the 1940s, eventually settling in Moscow where for decades he helped train Soviet agents against the West
 William Malisoff(Ph.D.) alleged Soviet spy, purportedly transferred advanced technology to the USSR
Hercules Mulligan – American Revolutionary War spy; member of the Sons of Liberty
 Isaiah Oggins(B.A.) Soviet spy eventually killed by his Soviet masters; he was the subject of the book The Lost Spy: An American in Stalin's Service
 William Perlalleged Soviet spy convicted for lying about his friendship with executed spy Julius Rosenberg, not convicted of espionage
 Victor Perlo(B.A. 1931, M.A. 1933, mathematics) alleged Soviet spy involved in Harold Ware spy ring and Perlo group as shown in Venona list of suspected subversives
 Juliet Stuart PoyntzCommunist Party USA founder alleged to have spied for the Soviet OGPU, mysteriously disappeared and presumed killed
 William Remington(M.A. 1940) alleged Soviet spy killed in prison; convicted of perjury, not convicted of espionage
 Nathaniel Weyl(B.S. 1931) confessed member of the Ware group of communists who engaged in espionage for the USSR in Washington, D.C.; after leaving the party, he became a conservative and avowed anti-communist
 Harry Dexter Whitealleged Soviet spy who spearheaded the creation of the World Bank and the International Monetary Fund; later revealed allegedly to have been involved with the Silvermaster and Ware groups of communist spies while he was a senior U.S. Treasury official in the Franklin D. Roosevelt and Truman administration
 Flora Wovschinalleged Soviet spies as revealed in the Venona project

Other

 Prince Hussain Aga Khan(M.I.A. 2004) elder son of Prince Karim Aga Khan IV
Hong Yen Chang(J.D. 1886), first Chinese American lawyer in the United States. The Colombia Law School Center for Chinese Legal Studies is named for him.
 Lewis Stuyvesant Chanler(LL.B. 1891) Lieutenant Governor of New York (1907–1908)
John Ray Clemmons (born 1977), member of the Tennessee House of Representatives, representing the 55th district, in West Nashville.
 Chelsea Clinton(M.A., 2010, University's Mailman School of Public Health)
 Henry Crugerelected to both Parliament of Great Britain (MP, 1774–1780, 1784–1790) and New York State Senate (1792–1796)
 Jesús Galíndez(Ph.D.) Spanish writer; during his time at Columbia, a lecturer and student before allegedly being kidnapped and presumably killed by agents of Rafael Trujillo
 Ian Kagedan(M.Phil. 1978) Canadian known for his work on inter-religious and inter-ethnic relations
 Caroline Kennedy(J.D. 1988) co-chair, candidate Barack Obama's Vice Presidential Search Committee; director, Commission on Presidential Debates; adviser, Harvard Institute of Politics; one of founders, Profiles in Courage Award; attorney, author
 John H. Langbein(B.A. 1964), legal scholar and professor at Yale Law School
 Meghan McCain(B.A.), columnist, author, and blogger
 Betsy McCaughey(Ph.D.), 72nd Lieutenant Governor of New York (1995–1998)
Dianne Morales (born 1967), non-profit executive and political candidate
 Robert Mosesleader of mid-century urban "renewal" that re-shaped New York
 Dillon S. Myer, director of War Relocation Authority during World War II and commissioner of Bureau of Indian Affairs (M.A. 1926)
 Charles J. O'Byrne(B.A. 1981, J.D. 1984) Secretary to the Governor of New York (2008)
 Ralph Perlman – (Master's in business), Louisiana state budget director, 1967–1988
 Richard Ravitch(B.A. 1955), 75th Lieutenant Governor of New York (2009–)
 Robert Reischauer(M.I.A., Ph.D.) director of the Congressional Budget Office (CBO) from 1989 to 1995
 Rebecca Rhynhart - (MPA) Philadelphia City Controller 2017–Present
 Patricia Robinson(M.A. 1957), economist and First Lady of Trinidad and Tobago from 1997–2003
 Angus B. Rothwell(M.A. 1932), Superintendent of Public Instruction of Wisconsin
 Karenna Gore Schiff(J.D. 2000) author, journalist, and attorney
 Pixley ka Isaka Seme(B.A.) founder and president of the African National Congress
 Pierre SévignyCanadian soldier, author, politician, and academic; best known for his involvement in the Munsinger Affair
 Thomas SowellAfrican American economist and author
 Ray William Johnsoninternet celebrity; host of internet series Equals Three (did not graduate)

See also
 Columbia College of Columbia University
 Columbia University School of General Studies
 Columbia Law School
 Columbia Business School
 Columbia University Graduate School of Journalism
 Columbia Graduate School of Architecture, Planning and Preservation
 Columbia University College of Physicians and Surgeons
 Columbia University Graduate School of Education (Teachers College)
 Fu Foundation School of Engineering and Applied Science
 Columbia Graduate School of Arts and Sciences
 Columbia University School of the Arts
 School of International and Public Affairs

Notes

References

External links
 Nobel Prize Winners associated with Columbia University
 Nobel Prize Winners in Physics associated with Columbia University
 Columbians Ahead of Their Timelist of notable Columbians created by Columbia University for their 250th anniversary.
 After Columbia "Notable Alumni & Former Students" published by the Columbia University Office of Admission

 
Columbia University people in politics, military and law
Politics